WSJU-LD (channel 32), branded on-air as Fresh HD, is a television station licensed to Ceiba, Puerto Rico. The station is owned by International Broadcasting Corporation. As of 2018, It is the only television station owned by AiLive.

History

In 1995, the station began operations as W59CW, operating on channel 59. From 1995 to 1999, it was owned by Fajardo TV Group. From 1999 to 2003, the station was owned by the late Frederick Gauthier De Castro, changed its channel position to channel 42, its call letters to WREY-LP, later WSEX-LP and at that time was broadcast local and regional programming. In 2003, channel 42 changed call sign to WIVE-LP and became a satellite of WTCV. On February 15, 2007, WIVE-LP was forced to be off the air due to financial and technical difficulties. On July 7, 2008, after nearly 1 year off the air, WIVE-LP resumes regular schedule programming. On September 11, 2014, after WTCV and its stations switched to Mega TV, WIVE-LP switches to TCV Music Network and broadcasts music videos full-time and it is the only low power analog television station in continuous operation in Puerto Rico. On November 1, 2018, after one year off the air, WIVE-LP resumes operations and rebrands itself as Mix TV, a TV channel that broadcasts Music videos and shares programming with radio station Mix 107.7 FM. On November 15, 2019, the station changed its callsign to WSJU-LP, which was formerly used the call letters for full-power WSJU-TV (channel 31) until September 2017. On July 1, 2021, WSJU-LP changed its branding to Fresh HD, and it will continue broadcasting music videos but with an American CHR format. On July 14, 2021, the station was licensed for digital operation and changed its callsign to WSJU-LD.

Branding

 1995–2003: Canal 59 Fajardo
 2003–2008: TCV
 2008–2014: Vive Tu Canal
 2014–2018: TCV Music Network
 2018–2020: Mix TV
 2020–2021: Telemaxx
 2021-present: Fresh HD

Digital television
WSJU-LD's digital signal is multiplexed:

References

External links

Television channels and stations established in 1995
SJU-LD
Ceiba, Puerto Rico
1995 establishments in Puerto Rico